Sheriffs and high sheriffs of Cornwall: a chronological list:

The right to choose high sheriffs each year is vested in the Duchy of Cornwall. The Privy Council, chaired by the sovereign, chooses the sheriffs of all other English counties, other than those in the Duchy of Lancaster. This right came from the Earldom of Cornwall. In the time of earls Richard and Edmund, the steward or seneschal of Cornwall was often also the sheriff.

Sheriffs before the 14th century

14th-century sheriffs

15th-century sheriffs

16th-century sheriffs

17th-century sheriffs

18th-century sheriffs

19th-century sheriffs

20th-century sheriffs before 1974

20th-century from 1974 (high sheriffs)

21st-century high sheriffs

See also

 List of office holders of the Duchy of Cornwall

Notes

References

Bibliography
  (with amendments of 1963, Public Record Office)
 
 
 

 
Cornwall
Local government in Cornwall
Cornwall-related biographical lists